Marcos Leonardo Sepúlveda San Juan (born 21 May 1976) is a Chilean former professional footballer who played as a forward for clubs in Chile, Argentina and Indonesia.

Club career
Born in Chillán, Chile, as a youth player, Sepúlveda was with the local clubs Deportivo Zaragoza and Unión Católica before joining Ñublense youth ranks.

A well remembered player of Ñublense in three stints (1994–96, 1998 and 2000), he made his professional debut thanks to the coach Eduardo De La Barra in 1994, taking part in the 1995 Copa Chile where the team reached the semi-finals after knocking-out Huachipato and Colo-Colo.

In his homeland he also played for Deportes Linares (1997), Santiago Morning (1999), O'Higgins (2000), Fernández Vial (2001, 2003–04), Provincial Osorno (2006–07) and Curicó Unido (2008).

Abroad, he had stints with Gimnasia LP in the Argentine Primera División and Arema Malang in the 2002 Liga Indonesia Premier Division.

He retired in 2008 after playing for Curicó Unido.

Coaching career
He began his career as coach at the Ñublense youth ranks, leading the B-team in the Segunda División Profesional in 2013.

In 2017, he coached Club Deportivo Buenos Aires from Parral in the fifth level of the Chilean football.

In 2019, he coached Independiente de Cauquenes in the Segunda División Profesional.

After he worked as football coach and motivational teller for the Municipality of Chillán until June 2020, being fired in the context of the COVID-19 pandemic.

Honours
Curicó Unido
 Primera B de Chile: 2008

References

External links
 
 
 Marcos Sepúlveda at PlaymakerStats.com

1977 births
Living people
People from Chillán
Chilean footballers
Chilean expatriate footballers
Ñublense footballers
Deportes Linares footballers
Club de Gimnasia y Esgrima La Plata footballers
Santiago Morning footballers
O'Higgins F.C. footballers
C.D. Arturo Fernández Vial footballers
Arema F.C. players
Provincial Osorno footballers
Curicó Unido footballers
Primera B de Chile players
Argentine Primera División players
Chilean Primera División players
Indonesian Premier Division players
Association football forwards
Chilean expatriate sportspeople in Argentina
Chilean expatriate sportspeople in Indonesia
Expatriate footballers in Argentina
Expatriate footballers in Indonesia
Chilean football managers
Ñublense managers
Segunda División Profesional de Chile managers